İlbeyi is a village in the Kiğı District, Bingöl Province, Turkey. The village is populated by Kurds and had a population of 12 in 2021.

The hamlets of Aşağıelbeyi, Çatallı, Honik, Örtülü, Sadık, Tepebaşı and Yukarıelbiyi are attached to the village.

References 

Villages in Kiğı District
Kurdish settlements in Bingöl Province